Diocese of the Southeast can refer to:
 La Diócesis del Sudeste (the Diocese of the Southeast, aka the Diocese of Southeastern Mexico), of the Anglican Church of Mexico
 The Diocese of the Southeast (Reformed Episcopal Church)